N. P. Rajendran is the chairman of Kerala Press Academy.  He was appointed in August 2011.  He is also the deputy editor of Mathrubhumi, a Malayalam daily, which he joined in 1981 after postgraduate studies in Economics. N. P. Rajendran has prepared numerous investigative reports, which have won him several awards.

Awards
 Vajrasooji award - 2001-02. 
 The Santhi Madom Sneha Rajyam Media Awards 2008. 
 K Balakrishnan award - 2010.
 New York India Press Club award - 2010.
 C.H. Mohammed Koya Journalism Awards  for the year 2011.

References

Living people
Indian publishers (people)
Malayalam-language journalists
1954 births
20th-century Indian economists
Indian male journalists
20th-century Indian journalists
Writers from Kozhikode
Indian editors